{{Infobox rail service
 | box_width   = 
 | name        = Colorado Eagle
 | color       =
 | logo        =
 | logo_width  =
 | image       = File:A 9 Photo Series, St. Louis Union Station, Note the Dates Carefully (23960179069).jpg
 | image_width = 300 px
 | caption     = Missouri Pacific E7A 26 with Train 11, The Colorado Eagle, waiting to depart St. Louis' Union Station on April 17, 1963
 | type        = Inter-city rail
 | system      = 
 | status      = Discontinued
 | locale      = Western United States/Midwestern United States
 | predecessor = Scenic Limited'
 | first       = 1942
 | last        = 1964
 | successor   = 
 | start       = St. Louis, Missouri
 | stops       = 
 | end         = Denver, Colorado 
 | stations    =
 | routes      =
 | owner       =
 | operator    = 
 | formeroperator= Missouri Pacific / Denver and Rio Grande Western
 | ridership   =
 | distance    =  (1957)
 | journeytime = Westbound: 18 hrs 50 minEastbound: 19 hrs 15 min (1957)
 | frequency   = Daily
 | trainnumber = Westbound: 11-4Eastbound: 3-12
 | class       =
 | access      =
 | seating     = Reclining seat coaches
 | sleeping    = Open sections in early years; Roomettes and Double Bedrooms
 | autorack    =
 | catering    = Diner-Bar-Lounge 
 | observation = Planetarium coach; Vista Dome Chair Car
 | entertainment= 
 | baggage     = 
 | otherfacilities=
 | stock       =
 | linelength  = 
 | tracklength =
 | tracks = 
 | gauge       = 
 | electrification =
 | speed       = 
 | elevation   =
 | map         = 
 | map_state   =
}}
The Colorado Eagle was an American streamlined passenger train operated by the Missouri Pacific Railroad (MP) in the mid 20th century. It operated between St. Louis, Missouri and Denver, Colorado, using MP trackage from St. Louis to Pueblo, Colorado and traveling on the Denver & Rio Grande Western Railroad from there to Denver. The train began service on June 21, 1942 and replaced those railroads' Scenic Limited.The Colorado Special operated until March 1964, when the name as well as on-board amenities (save for a diner-parlor coach for the initial St. Louis - Kansas City segment of the trip) were dropped as the MP reduced passenger service across its system. On April 2, 1966, the MP canceled the remaining unnamed trains serving Denver, ending passenger service along the Colorado Eagle'''s route west of Kansas City.

References

External link
 Colorado Eagle, July, 1957 timetable and consist at Streamliner Schedules

Passenger trains of the Missouri Pacific Railroad
Passenger trains of the Denver and Rio Grande Western Railroad
Named passenger trains of the United States
Night trains of the United States
Railway services introduced in 1942
Railway services discontinued in 1964
Passenger rail transportation in Missouri
Passenger rail transportation in Kansas
Passenger rail transportation in Colorado